Aleksandr Kalinin, Alexandr Kalinin, or Alexander Kalinin (variant transliterations of ) may refer to:
Aleksandr Kalinin (footballer) (born 1975), Russian football player and coach
Alexandr Kalinin (politician), Moldovan politician
 (born 1968), Russian chess grandmaster and coach
  (1910—1962), Hero of the Soviet Union
 (born 1944), Russian skating coach

ru:Калинин, Александр